Olena Zhupina ((born 23 August 1973) is a Ukrainian diver.

Career
She who won the bronze medal with Ganna Sorokina in the Women's 3m Synchronized Springboard competition at the 2000 Summer Olympics in Sydney, Australia. Zhupina also competed in the 1996 Summer Olympics and the 2004 Summer Olympics.

She has 28 medals total, 13 of which are gold. In April 2002, she took the first place in Stockholm, Sweden, in the European Champions Cup in synchronous springboard diving. In 2001, she participated at the 4th SuperFinal of the Grand Prix which was held in Athens, Greece.

References

1973 births
Ukrainian female divers
Living people
Divers at the 1996 Summer Olympics
Divers at the 2000 Summer Olympics
Divers at the 2004 Summer Olympics
Olympic divers of Ukraine
Olympic bronze medalists for Ukraine
Sportspeople from Zaporizhzhia
Olympic medalists in diving
Medalists at the 2000 Summer Olympics
World Aquatics Championships medalists in diving
Universiade medalists in diving
Universiade silver medalists for Ukraine
Medalists at the 2001 Summer Universiade
21st-century Ukrainian women